is a Japanese voice actor from Tokyo, Japan. He is affiliated with T's Factory. On February 2, 2014, he married fellow voice actor and Mahoromatic co-star Fujiko Takimoto.

Filmography

Anime

Film

Video games

Drama CD

Dubbing
Beautiful Love, Wonderful Life, Do Jin-woo (Oh Min-suk)

References

External links
  
 

1996 births
Japanese male video game actors
Japanese male voice actors
Living people
Male voice actors from Tokyo
20th-century Japanese male actors
21st-century Japanese male actors